The 162nd Infantry Division (162. Infanterie-Division) was a infantry division of the Wehrmacht during World War II.

History 
The division saw its first action in Operation Barbarossa as part of the XX Army Corps. It advanced over Bialystok and Smolensk to Moscow, where it was dissolved on 23 December 1941, after its destruction in the Battles of Kalinin and Rzhev. 

The Division's command served for the formation of the 162nd Turkoman Division in 1942.

The Division's only commander was Generalleutnant Hermann Franke.

Source

Infantry divisions of Germany during World War II
Military units and formations established in 1939
1939 establishments in Germany
Military units and formations disestablished in 1942